The Mettawee River (sometimes spelled "Mettowee River") is a tributary of Lake Champlain in western Vermont and eastern New York in the United States, passing the town of Granville, New York. The river is particularly good for rapids and kayaking.

See also
List of rivers of New York
List of rivers of Vermont

External links
Mettawee River - Granville Area Chamber of Commerce

Rivers of New York (state)
Rivers of Vermont
Tributaries of Lake Champlain
Rivers of Rutland County, Vermont
Rivers of Washington County, New York
New York placenames of Native American origin
Vermont placenames of Native American origin